The Pipistrel Nuuva V300 is an unmanned hybrid-electric VTOL cargo aircraft currently under development by Pipistrel and projected to be released in 2023. The aircraft has eight electric motors driving propellers providing lift as well as a single internal combustion engine driving a propeller providing thrust. In October 2020 the company announced that the aircraft would implement a Honeywell fly-by-wire system.

Design and development
The aircraft is a tandem wing design, with the rear wing of a larger wingspan than the front one. Both wings are attached to a fuselage, which features a large front door on the nose to access the internal  cargo hold and an internal combustion engine with a pusher propeller at the rear end.

A pair of booms, one at each side of the aircraft, connect both wings and serve primarily to support eight electric engines intended for vertical propulsion. Each electric engine turns a 2-blade propeller.

In October 2020 the company announced that the aircraft would implement a Honeywell fly-by-wire system with triple redundancy for the autonomous flight control of the vehicle. The flight itself would be autonomous but managed remotely by a ground-based operator.

Pipistrel is planning for the Nuuva V300 to enter service in the second half of 2023.

Specifications

See also
 Pipistrel 801 eVTOL

References

External links
Manufacturer Website

Hybrid electric aircraft
Proposed aircraft of Slovenia
Unmanned aerial vehicles of Slovenia